Mutchu Mithi (born April 28, 1978 at Roing, Arunachal Pradesh) is an Indian politician from the state of Arunachal Pradesh.

Mithi was elected from Roing seat in the 2014 and 2019 Arunachal Pradesh Legislative Assembly election. In terms of educational qualification, he is a graduate.

See also
Arunachal Pradesh Legislative Assembly

References

External links
Mutchu Mithi profile
MyNeta Profile
Janpratinidhi Profile

Indian National Congress politicians
Living people
People's Party of Arunachal politicians
Arunachal Pradesh MLAs 2014–2019
National People's Party (India) politicians
1978 births